Ada Williams may refer to:

 Ada Williams (actress) (born 1913), American film actress
 Ada Williams (baby farmer) (1875–1900), British murderer